Pauline Wilhelmine Rasmussen Schmidt (1865–1944), was a professional Danish magician and photographer. She was one of the few female magicians in Scandinavia during the 19th century.

Schmidt performed magic shows in Sweden and Finland during the 1880s. In 1888, she married the Finnish photographer Niels Rasmussen and became his colleague in Tampere, Finland. Schmidt opened her own studio in 1914.

Pauline Schmidt is portrayed in the novel Pauline Wilhelmine – trollkonstnärinna (Pauline Wilhelmine – a female magician), by Elisabeth Sandelin (2013).

References

 Nilsson, Christer: Trollare och andra underhållare / Christer Nilsson; under medverkan av Rolf Carlsten. Halmstad Spektra cop. 1990
 Danska fotografer i Finland | Hirn | Fund og Forskning i Det Kongelige Biblioteks Samlinger

External links 
 Pauline Rasmussen (s. 1865, k. 1944) The Finnish Museum of Photography 

1865 births
1944 deaths
19th-century Danish people
Female magicians
19th-century Finnish photographers
19th-century Danish women artists
Finnish magicians
19th-century women photographers
20th-century women photographers
20th-century Finnish photographers
19th-century circus performers